2 Chronicles 11 is the eleventh chapter of the Second Book of Chronicles the Old Testament in the Christian Bible or of the second part of the Books of Chronicles in the Hebrew Bible. The book is compiled from older sources by an unknown person or group, designated by modern scholars as "the Chronicler", and had the final shape established in late fifth or fourth century BCE. This chapter belongs to the section focusing on the kingdom of Judah until its destruction by the Babylonians under Nebuchadnezzar and the beginning of restoration under Cyrus the Great of Persia  (2 Chronicles 10 to 36). The focus of this chapter is the fallout from the unified kingdom of Israel's division in the beginning of Rehoboam's reign.

Text
This chapter was originally written in the Hebrew language and is divided into 23 verses.

Textual witnesses
Some early manuscripts containing the text of this chapter in Hebrew are of the Masoretic Text tradition, which includes the Aleppo Codex (10th century), and Codex Leningradensis (1008).

There is also a translation into Koine Greek known as the Septuagint, made in the last few centuries BCE. Extant ancient manuscripts of the Septuagint version include Codex Vaticanus (B; B; 4th century), and Codex Alexandrinus (A; A; 5th century).

Old Testament references
:

Rehoboam fortifies Judah (11:1–12)
Verses 1–4 parallel , but verses 5–12 has no parallel elsewhere. Rehoboam refrained from attacking Jeroboam because of a prophetic intervention (verse 4), an obedience for which he is rewarded. Instead, Rehoboam transformed some cities into fortresses (verses 6–10), all but Adoraim are mentioned elsewhere in the Hebrew Bible.

Verse 4
‘Thus says the Lord:
 "You shall not go up or fight against your brethren! Let every man return to his house, for this thing is from Me."‘Therefore they obeyed the words of the Lord, and turned back from attacking Jeroboam."This thing is from Me": compared to  2 Chronicles 10:15 "For the cause was of God."

 Rehoboam's supporters and family (11:13–23)
Verses 13-17 describe the consequences in Judah of Jeroboam's cult 'reforms', as it is reported in verse 15 that Jeroboam made idols (1 Kings 12:28–29 detail the placement of two golden calves in Bethel and Dan), then recruited new non-Levite priests who pledged allegiance to him, so the Levites (including the priests; verse 14) and the laymen (verse 16) from the northern kingdom came to Jerusalem for the legitimate sacrificial rite, exactly what Jeroboam wished to avoid with his religious policy. The Chronicles indicates that a large family and numerous children are a sign of God's blessing (without detailing Solomon's large family, perhaps because it is combined with the idolatry) so the family of Rehoboam is recorded especially in relation to the two wives, Mahalath and Maachah, who were closely related to David's family. Like David, his grandfather, Rehoboam places his sons in the administration of the kingdom (verses 22–23; cf. 1 Chronicles 18:17).

Verse 14 For the Levites left their suburbs and their possession, and came to Judah and Jerusalem: for Jeroboam and his sons had cast them off from executing the priest's office unto the Lord:''
The exodus of the priests and Levites from the northern Israel territory into Judah strengthened the southern kingdom and demonstrated Jeroboam's apostasy (cf. 1 Kings 12:28, 13:33; 14:8–9).

See also

Related Bible parts: 1 Kings 1, 1 Kings 10, 1 Kings 11, 1 Kings 12, 1 Chronicles 6, 1 Chronicles 18, 1 Chronicles 22, 1 Chronicles 29,

Notes

References

Citations

Bibliography

External links
 Jewish translations:
 Divrei Hayamim II - II Chronicles - Chapter 11 (Judaica Press) in Hebrew and English translation [with Rashi's commentary] at Chabad.org
 Christian translations:
 Online Bible at GospelHall.org (ESV, KJV, Darby, American Standard Version, Bible in Basic English)
 2 Chronicles Chapter 11. Bible Gateway

11